Oluf Berntsen (5 November 1891 – 26 June 1987) was a Danish fencer. He competed in three events at the 1912 Summer Olympics.

He was son of the Danish prime minister Klaus Berntsen and his brother, Aage Berntsen, also competed in fencing at the 1920 Summer Olympics.

References

1891 births
1987 deaths
Danish male fencers
Olympic fencers of Denmark
Fencers at the 1912 Summer Olympics
Sportspeople from Copenhagen